Our Memories of Elvis Volume 2 – More of the Pure Elvis Sound is an Elvis Presley album released by RCA Records (AQL1-3448) in July 1979. This was the second in the Our Memories series and wound up being the last following poor sales. Like the first volume, the album features ten tracks of 1970s Elvis songs with the overdubs removed. "I Got a Feelin' in My Body" was released as a single from the album and reached number six on the Billboard country singles chart. The album peaked at number 157 on the Billboard Top LPs chart on August 31, 1979, and number 12 on the Top Country Albums chart on September 12, 1979.

Track listing

Charts

References

1979 albums
Elvis Presley albums
Remix albums by American artists
RCA Records remix albums
Albums produced by Felton Jarvis
Remix albums published posthumously